Clania is a genus of moths belonging to the family Psychidae.

The species of this genus are found in Souteastern Asia and Australia.

Species:

Clania antrami 
Clania guineensis 
Clania ignobilis
Clania lewinii 
Clania licheniphilus 
Clania neocaledonica 
Clania variegata
Clania yamorkinei

References

Psychidae
Psychidae genera